Nicole Krauss (born August 18, 1974) is an American author best known for her four novels Man Walks into a Room (2002), The History of Love (2005), Great House (2010) and Forest Dark (2017), which have been translated into 35 languages.  Her fiction has been published in The New Yorker, Harper's, Esquire, and Granta's Best American Novelists Under 40, and has been collected in Best American Short Stories 2003, Best American Short Stories 2008 and Best American Short Stories 2019. In 2011, Nicole Krauss won an award from the Anisfield-Wolf Book Awards for Great House. A collection of her short stories, To Be a Man, was published in 2020 and won the Wingate Literary Prize in 2022.

Early life
Krauss, who grew up on Long Island, New York, was born in Manhattan, New York City, to a British Jewish mother and an American Jewish father, an engineer and orthopedic surgeon who grew up partly in Israel.
Krauss's maternal grandparents were born in Germany and Ukraine and later emigrated to London. Her paternal grandparents were born in Hungary and Slonim, Belarus, met in Israel, and later emigrated to New York.
Many of these places are central to Krauss's 2005 novel, The History of Love, and the book is dedicated to her grandparents.

Krauss, who started writing when she was a teenager, wrote and published mainly poetry until she began her first novel in 2001.

In 1987, when Krauss's father traveled with his family to Switzerland to take up a medical fellowship in Basel, she was enrolled as a boarder in the International School of Geneva, where she pursued her secondary school studies in Year 9. Krauss's memories of that experience are conveyed in her autobiographical short story "Switzerland", published in 2020.

Krauss enrolled in Stanford University in 1992, and that fall she met Joseph Brodsky who worked closely with her on her poetry over the next three years. He also introduced her to the work of writers such as Italo Calvino and Zbigniew Herbert. In 1999, three years after Brodsky died, Krauss produced a documentary about his work for BBC Radio 3.
She traveled to St. Petersburg where she stood in the "room and a half" where he grew up, made famous by his essay of that title. Krauss majored in English and graduated with honors, winning several undergraduate prizes for her poetry as well as the Dean's Award for academic achievement. She also curated a reading series with Fiona Maazel at the Russian Samovar, a restaurant in New York City co-founded by Roman Kaplan, Brodsky and Mikhail Baryshnikov.

In 1996 Krauss was awarded a Marshall Scholarship and enrolled in a master's program at Somerville College, Oxford, where she wrote a thesis on the American artist Joseph Cornell. During the second year of her scholarship she attended the Courtauld Institute in London, where she received a master's in art history, specializing in 17th-century Dutch art and writing a thesis on Rembrandt.

Career

In 2002, Doubleday published Krauss's acclaimed first novel, Man Walks Into a Room. A meditation on memory and personal history, solitude and intimacy, the novel won praise from Susan Sontag and was a finalist for a Los Angeles Times Book Award. The movie rights to the novel were optioned by Richard Gere.

Krauss's second novel, The History of Love, was first published as an excerpt in The New Yorker in 2004, under the title The Last Words on Earth. The novel, published in 2005 in the United States by W. W. Norton, weaves together the stories of Leo Gursky, an 80-year-old Holocaust survivor from Slonim, the young Alma Singer who is coping with the death of her father, and the story of a lost manuscript also called The History of Love. The book was a 2006 finalist for the Orange Prize for Fiction and won the 2008 William Saroyan International Prize for Writing for fiction. A film of the book, directed by Radu Mihăileanu, was released in 2016.

In spring 2007, Krauss was Holtzbrinck Distinguished Visitor at the American Academy in Berlin.

Her third novel, Great House, connects the stories of four characters to a desk of many drawers that exerts a power over those who possess it or have given it away. It was named a finalist for the 2010 National Book Award for Fiction and was shortlisted for the Orange Prize 2011 and also won an Award from the Anisfield-Wolf Book Awards in 2011.

In 2015 it was reported that Krauss had signed a $4 million deal with HarperCollins to publish her next two works: a novel, and also a book of short stories. The novel is entitled Forest Dark and was published in 2017. Francesca Segal, writing in the Financial Times, describes it as a "richly layered tale of two lives" that explores "ideas of identity and belonging – and the lure of the Tel Aviv Hilton". The novel's title is derived from the opening lines of Dante's Inferno, as translated by Henry Wadsworth Longfellow. The collection of short stories, To Be a Man, was published in 2020 and won the 2022 Wingate Literary Prize.

In 2020, Krauss was one of three Artists-in-Residence at Columbia University's Mortimer B. Zuckerman Mind Brain Behavior Institute.

In 2021, Krauss was the recipient of the Sami Rohr Prize for Jewish Literature, and the first to receive the newly created Inspiration Award, introduced to mark the 15th anniversary of the prize.

Themes
Krauss's work often explores the relationship between Jewish history and identity, the limited capacity of language and communication to produce understanding, loneliness, and memory. These themes are readily appreciable beginning in her first novel Man Walks Into a Room, wherein the protagonist loses years of lived memory while retaining all cognitive function. Playing with tenets of cognitive neuroscience and metaphysics, Man Walks Into a Room considers the relative roles of lived experience, materiality, and cognitive memory in shaping personal identity and being.

In a departure from her earlier work, Krauss's later novels progressively question and abandon traditional narrative structure in pursuit of themes more characteristic of late postmodern literature. Fragmentation and nonlinear narrative become increasingly present in her work through the use of multiple narrators whose narrative arcs may not directly meet but whose meanings are derived from resonance and pattern similarity (see The History of Love, Great House, Forest Dark). The History of Love and Forest Dark employ techniques of metafiction and intertextuality, questioning the veracity of the novel's form and antagonizing the traditional contract between reader and text. The co-protagonist of Forest Dark in particular is a novelist who shares the author's name and several biographical details, including reflections on a failed marriage to a man with whom the character has two children, considerations of the constraints of fiction, a fascination with Franz Kafka's life and writing, and a preoccupation with "Jewish mysticism, Israel and creation." In an August 2017 interview with The Guardian, Krauss is quoted saying:

This evident blurring of the distinction between reality and fiction seems to reflect a rejection of objectivism in favor of sublime relativism, and unites Krauss with the wider gestalt common to her postmodern peers.

Personal life
Krauss lives in Brooklyn, New York. She has two children, Sasha and Cy, by her former husband, the novelist Jonathan Safran Foer. She and Foer married in 2004 and divorced in 2014. Krauss subsequently embarked on a five-year relationship with the Israeli journalist and novelist Gon Ben Ari, whom she met when she granted him an interview several years earlier.

Krauss enjoys swimming and dancing.

Bibliography

Novels

Short story collections

Short stories

Essays and reporting

Review columns

Awards and accolades
 Wingate Literary Prize winner, 2022
 Sami Rohr Prize for Jewish Literature Inspiration Award, 2021
 Anisfield-Wolf Book Awards winner, 2011
 Orange Prize shortlist, 2011
 National Book Award finalist, 2010
 Selected as one of The New Yorker's "20 Under 40" writers to watch, 2010
 William Saroyan International Prize for Writing, 2008
 Granta's Best American Novelists under 40, 2007
 Prix du Meilleur Livre Étranger (Best Foreign Book Prize) (France), 2006
 Medicis Prize shortlist (France), 2006
 Femina Prize shortlist (France), 2006
 Orange Prize shortlist (U.K.), 2006
 Edward Lewis Wallant Award, 2005
 Named "Best and Brightest" writer by Esquire, 2002

Notes and references

Further reading
"Nicole Krauss: By the Book", The New York Times, September 7, 2017
"Nicole Krauss – 'It's limiting to describe myself as a Jewish writer'", interview with Anne Joseph in The Jewish Chronicle, September 7, 2017
"We create who we are. An interview with Nicole Krauss", video interview by Marc-Christoph Wagner on Louisiana Channel, 2012
"Q&A With Nicole Krauss, Author of Great House and The History of Love", interview with Elana Estrin in Huffington Post, September 15, 2011
Alexandra Schwartz: "Empty Rooms: On Nicole Krauss", in The Nation, January 31, 2011
"Author Nicole Krauss discusses her latest book Great House: A Novel", interview by Charlie Rose, video: December 7, 2010
Jennie Rothenburg Gritz: "Nicole Krauss on Fame, Loss, and Writing About Holocaust Survivors", in The Atlantic, October 21, 2010
"Critically acclaimed young novelist Nicole Krauss shares her latest work, Great House", interview by Charlie Rose, video: October 12, 2010

External links

  Official website

1974 births
Living people
20th-century American Jews
20th-century American novelists
20th-century American short story writers
20th-century American women writers
21st-century American Jews
21st-century American novelists
21st-century American short story writers
21st-century American women writers
Alumni of the Courtauld Institute of Art
Alumni of Somerville College, Oxford
American people of Belarusian-Jewish descent
American people of British-Jewish descent
American people of German-Jewish descent
American people of Hungarian-Jewish descent
American people of Ukrainian-Jewish descent
American women novelists
American women short story writers
Foer family
International School of Geneva alumni
Jewish American novelists
Jewish American short story writers
Marshall Scholars
Novelists from New York (state)
Postmodern writers
Stanford University alumni
Writers from New York City